The Basilica Cathedral of St. Cecilia (Basilique-Cathédrale Sainte-Cécile in French) is a Roman Catholic minor basilica and a cathedral dedicated to St. Cecilia located in Salaberry-de-Valleyfield, Quebec, Canada.  The basilica is under the circumscription of the Roman Catholic Diocese of Valleyfield.  The basilica was decreed on February 9, 1991.

References

External links

Churches in Montérégie
Salaberry-de-Valleyfield
Roman Catholic churches in Quebec
Basilica churches in Canada
Cathedrals in Quebec